KTFC Loei City Football Club  (Thai สโมสรฟุตบอลเคทีเอฟซี เลย ซิตี้), is a Thailand semi professional football club based in Loei Province. The club currently plays in Thai League 4 North Eastern Region.

History
Founded in 2009, Loei joined the new Thai football setup and started at the 3rd level setup, the Regional League North-East Division.

Loei duly came out on top come the end of the regular league season, thus claiming their first ever championship and also crowned as the first ever winners of the Regional League North-East Division.

On winning the championship, Loei entered the 2009 Regional League Championships. An end of season mini-league for all 5 Regional League Division 2 championship winning teams.

They retained 2010 Thai Division 2 League North Eastern Region title. For the second consecutive season they entered 2010 Regional League Division 2 play-offs. Yet again the Division 1 eluded them, and disappointingly Loei finished bottom in their mini-league.

Timeline
History of events of Loei City Football Club

Honours

Domestic leagues
Regional League North-East Division
 Winners (2) : 2009,2010
 Runner Up (1) : 2011

Stadium and locations

Season by season record

P = Played
W = Games won
D = Games drawn
L = Games lost
F = Goals for
A = Goals against
Pts = Points
Pos = Final position

QR1 = First Qualifying Round
QR2 = Second Qualifying Round
R1 = Round 1
R2 = Round 2
R3 = Round 3
R4 = Round 4

R5 = Round 5
R6 = Round 6
QF = Quarter-finals
SF = Semi-finals
RU = Runners-up
W = Winners

References

External links
 Loei City Fanclub on Facebook
 Official Facebookpage

Association football clubs established in 2009
Sport in Loei province
Football clubs in Thailand
2009 establishments in Thailand